Janet Amponsah (born 12 April 1993) is a Ghanaian sprinter. She represented her country at the 2013 World Championships without qualifying for the semifinals. She won medals in the 4 × 100 metres relay at two African Championships and at the 2010 Commonwealth Games. She was selected as Ghana's flag bearer at the opening ceremony of the 2014 Commonwealth Games and voted the 2015 Ghanaian Female Athlete of the Year. She missed the 2015 World Championships in China due to problems with her entry visa. At the 2016 Olympics, she competed in the 200 m and 4 × 100 m relay events.

She came second behind Ivorian Marie Josee Ta Louat at the 2018 women's 100m final at the African Senior Athletics Championships in Asaba, Nigeria.

Competition record

Personal bests
Outdoor
100 metres – 11.29 (-1.3 m/s) (Canyon 2015)
200 metres – 23.04 (+1.6 m/s) (Canyon 2015)

Indoor
200 metres – 23.40 (Albuquerque 2015)

References

1993 births
Living people
Ghanaian female sprinters
Athletes (track and field) at the 2010 Commonwealth Games
Athletes (track and field) at the 2014 Commonwealth Games
Athletes (track and field) at the 2018 Commonwealth Games
Athletes (track and field) at the 2015 African Games
Olympic athletes of Ghana
Athletes (track and field) at the 2016 Summer Olympics
Commonwealth Games medallists in athletics
Commonwealth Games silver medallists for Ghana
African Games silver medalists for Ghana
African Games medalists in athletics (track and field)
Sportspeople from Kumasi
Middle Tennessee State University alumni
Olympic female sprinters
Medallists at the 2010 Commonwealth Games